Autry-le-Châtel is a commune in the Loiret department in north-central France.

There is the church of Saint-Etienne, in the center of the village; it is a catholic church. There is also a castle.

A famous cheese in this region is the Crottin de Chavignol. If you want to buy it, you can go near Autry in different farms (for example, Le Grand Bardelet farm).

Geography 
The commune of Autry-le-Châtel is located in the southeast of the department of Loiret, in the agricultural region of Berry. It is located 62.1 km from Orléans, prefecture of the department, 45.8 km from Montargis, sub-prefecture, and 11.4 km from Châtillon-sur-Loire. The nearest municipalities are: Cernoy-en-Berry (7.7 km), Saint-Martin-sur-Ocre (8 km), Saint-Brisson-sur-Loire (8.1 km), Coullons (8.7 km) km), Poilly-lez-Gien (8.9 km), Blancafort (9.1 km, in the Cher), Saint-Firmin-sur-Loire (10.2 km), Gien (10.6 km), Briare (11 km) and Châtillon-sur-Loire (11.4 km).

Places and monuments 

 The remains of the old castle dating from the twelfth century
 The Small Castle dating from the end of the fifteenth century, listed as a historic monument on January 6, 1971
 The Saint-Etienne Church of the nineteenth century bears the name of "Liberty, Equality, Fraternity", motto of the French Republic
 A laundry
 The forest of Saint-Brisson
 The valley of Notre-Heure and its paddle-mills
 The pond of Coudreaux.

Population

See also
Communes of the Loiret department

References

Communes of Loiret